Jahre Line was a cruiseferry line operating on routes to and from Norway between 1961 and 1990. In 1990, it merged with Norway Line to form Color Line.

The following ships were part of Jahre Line's fleet:

  (1949-1963)
 MS Kronprins Harald (1) (1961-1975, 1976-1987 and 1987-1991)
 MS Prinsesse Ragnhild (1) (1966-1980 and 1981-1991)
 MS Wesertal (1973, chartered)
 MS Suffolk (1977, chartered)
 MS Janina (1980-1981)
 MS Jalina (1985-1987, chartered)

Color Line (ferry operator)
Ferry companies of Norway
Ferry companies of Oslo
Defunct companies of Norway
1961 establishments in Norway
1990 disestablishments in Norway